Wase Wind is a Flemish energy cooperative, active in the production of renewable energy and the supply of electricity from wind turbines.

Its headquarters is in the community of Sint-Gillis-Waas, Belgium.

Business

As a cooperative company, it unites the contributions of its shareholders and invests in projects for the realization of renewable energy production, via wind turbines in the region of Waasland.

History
The company was created in 2001, on the initiative of Kris Aper, Chris Derde, Geert De Roover, and Raf Vermeulen.

The cooperative has invested in 4 wind parks in the Waasland, which together produce clean energy for around 2900 members (shareholders / cooperants).

References

Electric power companies of Belgium
Wind power in Belgium
Energy cooperatives
Renewable energy companies of Europe
Wind power companies
Companies based in East Flanders
Waasland
Energy companies established in 2001
Renewable resource companies established in 2001
Sint-Gillis-Waas
Cooperatives in Belgium
Belgian companies established in 2001